Bacidina contecta is a species of lichen in the family Ramalinaceae, first found in inland rainforests of British Columbia.

References

contecta
Lichen species
Lichens described in 2009
Lichens of Western Canada
Taxa named by Toby Spribille
Fungi without expected TNC conservation status